David Hubert (born 12 February 1988) is a Belgian professional footballer who plays as a defensive midfielder for RSCA Futures.

Biography
Born in Wallonia, Hubert was raised in Uccle, suburban Brussels. Hubert made his debut in February 2008 in the match against K.V.C. Westerlo. In 2009, he won the Belgian Cup against KV Mechelen. On 19 May 2011 he was called up to the Belgium squad for the European Championship qualifier against Turkey.
During the season 2010–2011 he captained the team winning the Jupiler Pro League.
In the summer of 2011, after winning the Belgian Supercup, he managed to qualify for the UEFA Champions League after winning against Maccabi Haifa.
In January 2013 he joined KAA Gent on a 6 months loan deal after which he signed a 4-years agreement.

On 13 August 2022, Hubert signed with Anderlecht to play for their reserve team RSCA Futures in the second-tier Challenger Pro League.

Honours
Genk
 Belgian Pro League: 2010–11
 Belgian Cup: 2008–09
 Belgian Supercup: 2011

References

External links
 
 Guardian Football
 

1988 births
Living people
Belgian footballers
Belgian expatriate footballers
Association football defenders
K.V. Mechelen players
K.R.C. Genk players
K.A.A. Gent players
Hapoel Be'er Sheva F.C. players
S.K. Beveren players
Oud-Heverlee Leuven players
S.V. Zulte Waregem players
Belgian Pro League players
Challenger Pro League players
Israeli Premier League players
Expatriate footballers in Israel
Belgian expatriate sportspeople in Israel
Belgium under-21 international footballers
Belgium international footballers
Sportspeople from Namur (city)
People from Uccle
Footballers from Namur (province)
Footballers from Brussels
RSCA Futures players